The Lo Nuestro Award for Regional Mexican New Artist of the Year  was an honor presented annually by American network Univision. It was first awarded in 1989 and has been given annually since to recognize the most talented performers of Latin music. The nominees and winners were originally selected by a voting poll conducted among program directors of Spanish-language radio stations in the United States and also based on chart performance on Billboard Latin music charts, with the results being tabulated and certified by the accounting firm Deloitte. At the present time, the winners are selected by the audience through an online survey. The trophy awarded is shaped in the form of a treble clef.

The award was first presented to Mexican singer José Javier Solís. Mexican singer Pablo Montero and group Los Temerarios, winners in 1990 and 1999, respectively, were also nominated for a Grammy Award for Best Mexican/Mexican-American Album; while 2009 nominees Los Pikadientes de Caborca were also shortlisted for a Grammy Award for Best Regional Mexican Album. Mexican performer Ezequiel Peña was nominated as part of the group Banda Vallarta Show in 1993 and won as a solo performer two years later. Mexican singer and actress Mariana Seoane, winner in 2005, received a Latin Grammy Award nomination for Best Grupero Album. Mexican singer Gerardo Ortíz won the award in 2011, only a few weeks after he had survived an ambush attempt during which his cousin and business manager had been killed. In 2013, the Pop, Regional Mexican and Tropical Salsa New Artist of the Year categories were merged on a Lo Nuestro Award for New Artist of the Year category in the General Field.

Winners and nominees
Listed below are the winners of the award for each year, as well as the other nominees for the majority of the years awarded.

See also
 Latin Grammy Award for Best New Artist

References

Regional Mexican New Artist of the Year
.
Music awards for breakthrough artist
Awards established in 1989
Awards disestablished in 2012